Craigo is a village in Angus, Scotland. Craigo developed in the 19th century as a textile village.

External links
History of Craigo in Angus

References

Villages in Angus, Scotland